Local elections were held in the province of Marinduque on May 10, 2010, as part of the 2010 general election.  Voters selected candidates for all local positions: a town mayor, vice mayor and town councilors, as well as four members of the Sangguniang Panlalawigan, the vice-governor, governor and representative for the lone district of Marinduque.

Gubernatorial, vice gubernatorial and congressional election
Incumbent governor Jose Antonio N. Carrion will run for his second term as governor of Marinduque. This election, he will run under the Lakas-Kampi-CMD banner; he ran previously as an independent on the last election.

Incumbent congresswoman Carmencita Reyes is allowed to run for a second term, but chose to run for governor. She was formerly a member of Lakas–CMD but became an independent candidate due to the Carrion's membership of Lakas-Kampi-CMD. Despite of all of this she was the guest candidate of the Liberal party. On the ballot she was Bigkis Pinoy's candidate.

Former Sta. Cruz mayor and businessman Wilfredo Red will run again for governor. He failed to win the previous election and was in the last place in the race for governor, which was won by Carrion.

Incumbent vice-governor Tomas Pizarro will run for his second term as vice-governor of Marinduque. He was a member of Kampi during the last election. He defected to the Nacionalista Party for this election.

Incumbent sangunniang panlalawigan member Jasper Lim is allowed to run for a third term, but chose to run for vice-governor. He was bannered under his brother and former Liga ng mga Barangay sa Pilipinas president James Marty Lim's Alliance for Barangay Concerns party. He is also the running mate of Carrion under the Lakas-Kampi-CMD

With Carmencita Reyes running for governor, her son and former congressman Edmundo O. Reyes is expected to reclaim his seat. He  defected to the Liberal party after Carrion's membership to Lakas-Kampi-CMD party. He did not run in the previous election because he was ineligible to run because he already claimed the three-term limit.

Provincial Administrator and Carrion ally Lord Allan Jay Velasco will also run for the congressional seat, despite having no previous experience in Marinduque politics but, as provincial administrator, Velasco is the Lakas-Kampi-CMD nominee for the said congressional elections.

The primary issue for this upcoming elections was the ongoing power crisis happening at Marinduque.

Results

Provincial and congressional election results

Parties are as stated in their certificate of candidacies.

Notes
 A* Carmencita Reyes is also a guest candidate of the Liberal Party.

Sangguniang Panlalawigan Election results
Voting is via plurality-at-large voting: in each of Marinduque's two districts, voters will vote for four members of the provincial legislature, then the four candidates with the highest number of votes are elected.

1st District

Municipality: Boac, Mogpog, Gasan

|colspan=5 bgcolor=black|

Mark Joseph de Leon (Independent) was disqualified after the ballots were printed. All of his votes are considered spoilt.

2nd District
Municipality: Sta. Cruz, Torrijos, Buenavista

|colspan=5 bgcolor=black|

Municipal Election results

Parties are as stated in their certificate of candidacies.

Boac

 Jose Alvarez later joined the Pwersa ng Masang Pilipino. However he is still listed on the official ballot as an independent candidate.
 Roberto Madla later joined the Lakas-Kampi-CMD. However he is still listed on the official ballot as an independent

Mogpog

Gasan

Notes
 * James Marty Lim's party-list Alliance for Barangay Concerns is also a local political party in Gasan, Marinduque and in coalition with the Lakas Kampi CMD. (Includes Jasper Lim and political officials of Gasan under Lakas Kampi CMD)

Sta. Cruz

Torrijos

Buenavista

External links
 Official Candidates of the Province of the Marinduque
 Office Website of the Province of Marinduque

2010 Philippine local elections
2010
May 2010 events in Asia